Trevor Fitzroy James (born 19 March 1949) is a Trinidad and Tobago sprinter. He competed in the men's 200 metres at the 1972 Summer Olympics.

References

1949 births
Living people
Athletes (track and field) at the 1972 Summer Olympics
Trinidad and Tobago male sprinters
Olympic athletes of Trinidad and Tobago
Pan American Games medalists in athletics (track and field)
Pan American Games bronze medalists for Trinidad and Tobago
Athletes (track and field) at the 1971 Pan American Games
Medalists at the 1971 Pan American Games